Clepsis phaeana is a species of moth of the family Tortricidae. It is found in Siberia.

References

Moths described in 1916
Clepsis